Chapagaun वादे (Nepal Bhasa) is a village development committee in Godawari Municipality in Lalitpur District in the Bagmati Zone of central Nepal. At the time of the 1991 Nepal census it had a population of 9,600 in 1,643 individual households.

References

External links
UN map of the municipalities of Lalitpur District

Populated places in Lalitpur District, Nepal